Streptomyces variegatus is a bacterium species from the genus of Streptomyces. Streptomyces variegatus produces prodigiosin.

See also 
 List of Streptomyces species

References

Further reading

External links
Type strain of Streptomyces variegatus at BacDive -  the Bacterial Diversity Metadatabase	

variegatus
Bacteria described in 1986